Nathan Williams may refer to:
Nathan Williams (rugby union) (born 1983), Welsh rugby player
Nathan Williams (politician) (1773–1835), United States Representative from New York
Nathan Williams (Zydeco) (born 1964), American Zydeco accordionist and singer
Nathan Williams (EastEnders), character from the British soap opera EastEnders
Nathan Hale Williams (born 1976), American film and television producer
Nathan Williams, guitarist and founding member of surf rock band Wavves
Nathan Williams, founder and editor-in-chief of magazine Kinfolk